The Lenca are from present day southwest Honduras and eastern El Salvador in Central America. They once spoke many dialects such as Chilanga, Putun, Kotik etc. Although there were different dialects, they understood and coexisted with each other. These dialects are now nearly extinct. In Honduras, the Lenca are the largest tribal group, with an estimated population of more than 450,000.

History

Pre-European era 

Since pre-European times the Lencas occupied various areas of what is now known as Honduras and El Salvador. The Salvadoran archaeological site of Quelepa (which was inhabited from the pre-classic period to the beginning of the early post-classic period) is considered a site that was inhabited and ruled by the Lencas. Another important center of the Lencas is the Yarumela settlement in central Honduras in the Comayagua Valley, which was an active city in the late Pre-Classic and Early Classic periods; archaeologists come to believe that it was a very important commercial center for this culture. Other minor settlements are Tenampua and Los Naranjos, also located in the center of what is now the Republic of Honduras. The earliest known references in western discourse about the term Lenca dates back to 1548, in the Provanzas de Juan Ruiz de la Vega, AGCA, A1.29,40.102,4670.”  The word  ”Lenca” was originated By The Taulepa Clan Which Meant The Common Wealth of the People. Raphael Girard, wrote about the origin of the Kiche and other Maya groups. He also addresses a brief section on the question of the Lenca.

At the beginning of the 16th century, each dialect had its own confederation, each divided into several manors constituted at the same time by several towns. Each town was governed by a main head man who was assisted by four lieutenants who helped him in the tasks of the their society. and he was succeeded by his first-born or selected by the clan mothers. Wars were not that common during times of peace unless a radical tribal Clan Members tried to over throw the clan mothership. Lencas were multilingual as many other empires and nations were before, speaking languages such as Pipil, Chorti, Xinca, Mangue etc. Its objective was to expand trade on certain times of the year, the different Lenca lordships made truces. these truces are remembered by the Lencas as the Wankasku (Guancasco) ceremony. The commoner Lencas dedicated themselves mainly to planting cornfields, Roots such as Yuca (Manioke), Potato (Patewa), sweet potato (Kumarewa, Cacao (Kaukau) etc.

Spanish conquest 

During the conquest, its towns were evangelized. Some more conservative communities resisted converting to Catholicism, while others converted more peacefully. At the time of the Spanish conquest only Five Lencas are named in the documents of that time: Antú Silan Ulap, Lempira, Mota, Entepica, and Guancince.

Lempira organized a war of resistance that lasted about twelve years and ended with his death in 1537. When the Spaniards arrived, their population, together with that of the Pipil and Poqomam, was 116,000 to 300,000 souls.  Other estimates speak that the Lencas themselves numbered 300,000 (1520s) and about 25,000 in 1550. The Lempira resistance and defense of 1537-1538 managed to arm more than 30,000 warriors, indicating a large population, but some mention that the population in 1537 was barely 15,000 souls and it dropped to 8,000 two years later due to diseases brought from the European continent.
Mota led the Lenca war defence in the surrounding settlement of Gracias a Dios, in the current department of Lempira and the exterior rio coco in Miskito territories from the Spaniards; Entepica was chief of Piraera and lord of Cerquín.

Independence 
After independence from Spain in 1821 and the formation of the Republic of Honduras, the formation of a new country was legalized through the constitution, of which tribal clans and ethnic groups were not part of the spoils of war or receiving  total sovereignty back even though tribals participated as combatants.

XXI century 
Despite the adoption of Catholicism, Spanish language, and the loss of their tribal language, the Lenca still preserve several features of their original culture today. In 1993, the tribal leader and Lenca activist Berta Cáceres co-founded the Civic Council of Popular and Indigenous Organizations of Honduras (COPINH). In 2015 she won the Goldman Environmental Prize and in March 2016 she was cruelly murdered, being honored both in her country and abroad thanks to her constant and long environmental struggle and for the rights of the tribal peoples of Honduras.

Culture
While there are ongoing political problems in contemporary Central America over tribal sovereignty, land rights and identity, the Lenca have retained many of their pre-European customs of usage of land by international laws. Although their tribal language is nearly extinct, and their culture has changed in other ways over the centuries due to the Spanish influence, the Lenca continue to preserve some custom ways and identify as tribal people. There are programs and dictionaries to help revitalize the language and custom Lenca culture. Aside from that, the Lenca still eat their Traditional foods like Atol Shuko (Black Corn Paste looks purple), Tamales Pisques, Miel de Jocote (Jocote Syrup), Miel De Mango (Mango Syrup), Panal De Abeja (Bee hives), Cuzuco (Armadillo), Garrobo (stone Iguana), Chakalines (River shrimp), Punches (River Crab) etc.

Economy
Modern Lenca communities are centered on the milpa crop-growing system. Lenca men engage in agriculture, including the cultivation of coffee, cacao, tobacco, varieties of plantains, and gourds. Other principal crops are maize, wheat, beans, squash, cacoa beans, sugarcane, and chili peppers. In El Salvador peanuts are also cultivated. Within their communities, Lenca traditionally expect all members to participate in communal efforts.

While there has been a growing national acceptance of tribal rites and culture in both Honduras and El Salvador, the Lenca continue to struggle in both nations over tribal territorial sovereign rites of custom and usage of the land. In the mid-1990s, tribal leaders formed political groups in order to petition the government over issues of land ownership and tribal rites. Due to the unresolved land issues and constitutional amendments in those countries that favor land ownership by large-scale investors and agro-industrialists, there has been a decreasing amount of land for tribal people. Many Lenca men have had to find employment in neighboring cities.

Many Lenca communities still have their communal territory. They devote the majority of cultivation to commodity crops raised for export to foreign markets. Most Lenca still use traditional agricultural practices on their own crops, as well as the crops for investors.

Material culture
During the Pre-European Era, Lencan pottery was very similar to that of other Mesoamerican groups, especially Mayan pottery and that of several groups from central Mexico. Today, Lencan pottery is very distinctive. Handcrafted by Lenca women, the modern custom pottery is considered an ethnic marking of their culture, as is common among custom Lenca people. Many handmade pieces are sold at very high prices in the United States and Europe.

In the mid-1980s, NGO cooperatives of women artisans were created in order to market their pottery. To increase sales of their works, the cooperatives were encouraged to orient their designs and styles to meet the tastes of urban buyers and to expand their market. In the 21st century, Lenca women are making modern painted pottery (often painted black and white) not based on traditional designs in an effort to appeal to foreign buyers.

Custom Lencan pottery is still made by women in the town of Gracias, Honduras and the surrounding villages, most notably in La Campa. The pieces are usually a dark orange or brick color. Visitors can watch demonstrations of how custom pottery is made.

Spirituality
The contemporary Lenca primarily practice Roman Catholicism, adopted, often by force, during the colonial Spanish era after the first war. The Battle of Acajutla was a battle on June 8, 1524, between the Spanish conquistador Pedro de Alvarado and the standing army of Cuzcatlan Pipils, an indigenous Nahua state, in the neighborhood of present-day Acajutla, near the coast of western El Salvador. As with other tribal groups, their practices often incorporate Pre-European custom, and some Lenca communities retain more exclusively tribal customs. Some custom practices are associated with the cultivation and harvest of crops. During different crop seasons, for instance, Lenca men participate in ceremonies where they consume chicha and burn incense.

Guancasco
Guancasco is the annual ceremony by which neighboring communities, usually two, gather to establish reciprocal obligations in order to confirm peace and friendship. The guancascos take many forms and have adopted many Catholic representations, but they also include traditional customs and representations. Processions and elaborate exchanges of greetings and Honduran folk dancing are performed for the statue of the patron saint of the town. Towns in central and western Honduras such as Yamaranguila, La Campa, La Paz and Tencoa, all host the annual celebration.

Archaeology

Until recently, archaeological research and investigation of Lenca settlements had been limited. In studies of how the tribal and colonial cultures affected each other, more attention had been given to colonial-era settlements influenced by Europeans. In addition, many tribal sites are isolated and difficult to access. Researchers may also have difficulty conducting excavations because the sites are found in agricultural fields under cultivation. Surface evidence in rural areas reveals that pre-European tribal settlements existed in many regions. Many surface-visible earthwork mounds have been damaged from being plowed over by rural farmers.

The evidence for pre-European Lenca has come from research and excavation of several sites in Honduras and El Salvador. It shows that Lenca occupation was characterized by a relatively continuous pattern of growth.

The Comayagua Valley is located at the highland basin linking the Pacific and Caribbean drainage systems of Honduras. The valley provides evidence for a rich setting of cross-cultural relationships and Lenca settlements. According to Boyd Dixon, research in the area has revealed a complex history spanning approximately 2500 years from the early pre-classic period to the Spanish Conquest of 1537. Prehistoric Lenca settlements were typically located along major rivers to afford access to water for drinking and washing and to waterways for transportation. The lowlands were typically fertile areas. The Lenca built relatively few and small monumental public structures, except for military fortifications. Most constructions were made of adobe rather than stone.

In his research of the Comayagua Valley region, Dixon finds ample evidence of cross-cultural relationships; many artifacts have been found that show that settlements were linked through ceramics. The production of Usulua Polychrome ceramics has been shown to link Lenca settlements with neighboring chiefdoms during the classic period. The Lenca sites of Yarumela and Los Naranjos in Honduras, and Quelepa in El Salvador, all contain evidence of Usulután-style ceramics.

Yarumela is an archaeological site in the Comayagua Valley believed to be a primary Lenca center during the middle and late formative periods. The site contained a large primary residential center several times the size of that of its neighboring settlements which were secondary centers in the region. The site was most likely chosen because of its proximity to some of the major floodplains in the valley, whose fertile soil was cultivated for agriculture. The pattern and scale of the late pre-classic settlements suggest the existence of a ranked society. All corners of the basin were located within a half-day walk of Yarumela.

Other features found in the area are at the sites of Los Naranjos and Chalchuapa in El Salvador, each dominated by a single constructed earthen mound. Many other sites appear to share site-planning principles and structural forms with these examples, having large, open, flat plazas, leveled by manual grading, and dominated by a massive two- to three-tiered pyramidal earthwork mound.

Quelepa is a major site in eastern El Salvador.  Its pottery shows strong similarities to ceramics found in central western El Salvador and the Maya highlands. Archaeologists speculate that Quelepa was settled by Lenca speakers from Honduras. Population pressure may have prompted their migrations to new territory.  Another site is Tenampua, a city located in the valley of comaygua of the Classic period, the city was protected by a series of walls still visible today. Various vases managed to be rescued from the site and taken to national museums.

Since the late 20th century, scholars have focused on researching and exploring settlement patterns of the Lenca in order to better understand the chronology of settlement during the pre-Columbian era.

Tourism
Lenca heritage tourism is expanding. It has brought attention to indigenous Lenca traditions and culture, especially in Honduras. The Honduran Tourism Institute, along with the United Nations Development Program, has developed a cultural heritage project dedicated to the Lenca and their culture called La Ruta Lenca. This tourist route passes through a series of rural towns in southwestern Honduras within traditional Lenca territory. The route has designated stops in the departments of Intibuca, La Paz, Lempira, and adjacent valleys.

Stops include La Campa, where traditional Lenca pottery is handcrafted by a cooperative; the archaeological sites of Los Naranjos and Yarumela; the town of Gracias, and other towns with Lenca heritage. La Ruta Lenca was designed to attract tourism to Lenca communities and to encourage preservation of remaining indigenous cultural practices by increasing the economic return for artisans and providing new markets. The project has had some successes.

Environmental activism
Members of the Lenca community have taken larger national roles since the late 20th century, primarily in the areas of human and land rights for the indigenous peoples, which are seen as inextricably linked. They have also been active in a variety of environmental issues, particularly in trying to protect their territories against major development projects that would alter their lands and ecology. The risk of speaking out has been great; indigenous people opposing such major developments have been murdered.

Berta Cáceres was an important leader of the Lenca and founder of the Council of Popular and Indigenous Organizations of Honduras (COPINH). Cáceres strongly protested the development of the DESA Agua Zarca Hydro Project and dam on the Gualcarque River in Honduras. Cáceres won the 2015 Goldman Environmental Prize for her work with the Lenca and her leadership in environmental movements. She was discovered murdered at her home on 3 March 2016. In a news report published on June 21, a former soldier of Honduras’ Inter-Institutional Security Force (known as Fusina) alleged that Cáceres’ name, along with the names of other environmentalists in Honduras, had appeared on a military hit list. A few weeks after her murder, major international investors—the Netherlands Development Finance Co. (FMO) and FinnFund—announced that they would suspend funding for the Agua Zarca project. On July 8, Secretary of Security Julian Pacheco said that the government had failed to provide adequate protection for Cáceres, who had received death threats previously.

Lesbia Yaneth was another Lenca activist who opposed the Aurora hydroelectric project which was planned in the municipality of San José, La Paz. This project was very important to the government; "the vice-president of the National Congress, Gladys Aurora Lopez," was reported as having "direct ties" to it. Yaneth's body was found on 7 July 2016; she had been murdered the previous day in the Matamulas sector of Marcala. Police initially claimed that Yaneth was killed during the robbery of her professional bike. Because she was active in COPINH, however, fellow members and supporters believe that she was assassinated because of her political work. United Nations and European Union officials protested her death. Three suspects were arrested within a week of the Yaneth murder.

Notable Lencas
Lempira             
Berta Caceres                    
Bertha Zúñiga     
 Johnny Leverón

See also
Peñol de Cerquín

Notes

Sources
 Adams, Richard. 1956. "Cultural Components of Central America." American Anthropologist, - Vol 58(5), 881-907
 Black, Nancy. 1995. The Frontier Mission and Social Transformation in Western Honduras: The Order of Our Lady of Mercy, 1523-1773. E.J. Brill, Leiden. 
 Bosshard, Peter, 2016 "Who Killed Berta Cáceres?" "The Huffington Post", - 03/04/2016 
 Brady, Scott. 2009. "Revisiting a Honduran Landscape Described by Robert West: An Experiment in Repeat Geography," Journal of Latin American Geography - Vol 8(1),7-27
 Carmack, Robert M. with Janine L. Gasco and Gary H. Gossen. (2007). The Legacy of Mesoamerica: History and Culture of a Native American Civilization – 2nd ed. New Jersey: Pearson Education, Inc.
 Chapman, Anne. 1985. Los Hijos del Copal y la Candela: Ritos agrarios y tradicion oral de los lencas de Honduras. Universidad Nacional Autonoma de Mexico, Mexico City.
 Dixon, Boyd. 1989. "A Preliminary Settlement Pattern Study of a Prehistoric Cultural Corridor: The Comayagua Valley, Honduras", Journal of Field Archaeology. Vol 16(30, 257–271, via JSTOR
 Healy, P. 1984. "The Archaeology of Honduras", in The Archaeology of Lower Central America. Edited by F. Lange and D. Stone. Albuquerque: University of New Mexico Press, 113-161
 2007. "Honduras and the Bay Islands", from Lonely Planet Publications Pty. Ltd.
 McFarlane, W. and Stockett, M. (2007). Archaeology and Community Development in the Jesus de Otoro Valley of Honduras. Paper presented at the 72nd Annual Meeting of the Society for American Archaeology, Austin, Texas, April 26
 Minority Rights Group International, World Directory of Minorities and indigenous Peoples - Honduras: Lenca, Miskitu, Tawahka, Pech, Chortia and Xicaque, 2008
 Minority Rights Group International, World Directory of Minorities and indigenous Peoples - El Salvador: indigenous peoples, 2008
 Nuwer, Rachel. 2016. "The Rising Murder Count of Environmental Activists" "New York Times", - 6/27/2016 
 Sheets, P. 1984. "The Prehistory of El Salvador: An Interpretive Summary", in The Archaeology of Lower Central America. Edited by F. Lange and D. Stone. Albuquerque: University of New Mexico Press, 85-112
 Stone, Doris. 1963. "The Northern Highland Tribes: the Lenca", in Handbook of South American Indians. Vol. 4: the Circum-Caribbean Tribes, 205-217

External links
 The UN Refugee Agency - El Salvador
 The UN Refugee Agency - Honduras

 
Circum-Caribbean tribes
Indigenous peoples in El Salvador
Indigenous peoples in Honduras
Mesoamerican cultures
Ethnic groups divided by international borders